Tieta of Agreste is a 1996 Brazilian comedy film directed by Carlos Diegues. It is based on the novel Tieta by Jorge Amado. The film was selected as the Brazilian entry for the Best Foreign Language Film at the 69th Academy Awards, but was not accepted as a nominee.

Cast
 Sônia Braga as Antonieta "Tieta" Esteves Cantarelli 
 Marília Pêra as Perpétua Esteves Batista 
Anna Cotrim as young Perpétua 
 Chico Anysio as Zé Esteves, the Tieta's father
 Cláudia Abreu as Leonora Cantarelli 
 Zezé Motta as Carmosina "Carmô"
 Jece Valadão as Commandant Dario 
 Harildo Deda as coronel Artur da Tapitanga
 André Valli as Barbozinha
 Heitor Martinez as Ricardo "Cardo" Esteves Batista 
 Noélia Marcondes as Tonha
 Patrícia França as Imaculada and young Tieta
 Daniel Filho as Mirko Stephano
 Virginia Rodrigues as singer
 Jorge Amado as narrator

Soundtrack

See also
 List of submissions to the 69th Academy Awards for Best Foreign Language Film
 List of Brazilian submissions for the Academy Award for Best Foreign Language Film

References

External links
 

1996 films
1996 comedy films
1990s Portuguese-language films
Brazilian comedy films
Films directed by Carlos Diegues
Films based on works by Jorge Amado